The Richmond Roosters were a professional baseball team based in Richmond, Indiana from 1995-2005. The Roosters played in the independent Frontier League, which at that time had no affiliation with Major League Baseball.

The Roosters began play in the third season of the Frontier League when the Kentucky Rifles franchise folded and Richmond was granted an expansion team. The team played at Don McBride Stadium in Richmond. The franchise was sold after the 2005 season, moved to Traverse City, Michigan and became the Traverse City Beach Bums, who played at Wuerfel Park in the Traverse City suburb of Blair Township from 2006-2018.

In 2018, the franchise was then sold to the owners of the Midwest League West Michigan Whitecaps who folded the Frontier League affiliation and launched a new team in the Northwoods League, the Traverse City Pit Spitters.

The team is represented in the Frontier League Hall of Fame by Richmond player-manager Fran Riordan, Richmond part-owner Duke Ward, along with Roosters first-basemen Morgan Burkhart, pitcher Matt Schweitzer, outfielder Pete Pirman, and pitcher Bobby Chandler.

Richmond Roosters

The Richmond Roosters returned professional baseball to Richmond, Indiana in 1995, with the last professional team being the class D Richmond Tigers of the Ohio-Indiana League, a Detroit Tigers affiliate, which folded in 1951. The team played at historic McBride Stadium, which opened in 1936.

The Roosters were led in the 1995 season by Morgan Burkhart, who would become the second Frontier League player to make a Major League Baseball team when he joined the Boston Red Sox in 2000. Brian Tollberg of the Chillicothe Paints was the first league alumnus to make the majors, beating Burkhart by a week in the 2000 season. Burkhart won three league Frontier League MVP awards (1995-1997) and the league MVP award is now named after him. On June 8, 1997, Roosters pitcher Christian Hess threw the first no-hitter in Frontier League history, defeating the Kalamazoo Kodiaks 9-0 in Kalamazoo.

Richmond won back-to-back Frontier League championships in 2001 and 2002, led by player-manager Fran Riordan. In 2001, the Roosters upset the league-best Paints 2-0 in the best-of-three championship series to capture their first Frontier League title. The team was led by pitcher Steve Carver (10-3, 3.91 ERA), closer Mike Ziroli (1-1, 2.58 ERA, 16 saves), 1B Riordan (.299 BA, 14 HR, 74 RBI) and C-1B Steve Mitrovich (.304 BA, 12 HR, 65 RBI). The team repeated as Frontier League champions in 2002, again upsetting the league-best Washington Wild Things 3-1 in a best of five series for the title. The Roosters were led in 2002 by pitchers Enriques Baca (10-4, 2.87 ERA) and Matt Schweitzer (8-2, 4.29 ERA), Fran Riordan (.314 BA, 11 HR, 81 RBI), and league MVP OF Phil Willingham (.360 BA, 15 HR, 86 RBI, 36 SB).

Growth in the Frontier League challenged the small Richmond franchise and the ownership group elected to sell the franchise at the conclusion of the 2005 season. The last home game for the Roosters was a 9-3 loss to the Evansville Otters on September 2, 2005 and the team finished the season on the road with the last Richmond game being a 9-8 road loss to the Florence Freedom on September 5, 2005.

Traverse City Beach Bums

In 2005, the Richmond Roosters were purchased and the franchise moved to Traverse City, Michigan for the 2006 Frontier League season, playing at Wuerfel Park.  The Beach Bums added to the franchise championship history in 2015, advancing from a play-in game to take the title in a best of five series sweep, defeating the River City Rascals 3-0.

Declining attendance led to the team being sold at the conclusion of the 2018 season to owners of the West Michigan Whitecaps, the franchise left the Frontier League to join the summer collegiate baseball Northwoods League, and the team's name was changed to the Traverse City Pit Spitters. The stadium was renamed to Turtle Creek Stadium after the sale. The franchise's final Frontier League professional game was a 9-2 home loss to the Windy City ThunderBolts on August 31, 2018, before 3,142 spectators.

Season-by-season records

References

External links 

 Frontier League
 Richmond Roosters Statistics

Former Frontier League teams
Defunct baseball teams in Indiana
Defunct independent baseball league teams
Baseball teams established in 1995
Defunct Frontier League teams
Baseball teams disestablished in 2018